The Catholic Church in Ukraine is part of the worldwide Catholic Church, under the spiritual leadership of the Pope in Rome.

The majority of Catholics in Ukraine belong to the Ukrainian Greek Catholic Church, while significant numbers of others belong to the Latin Church Ruthenian Greek Catholic Church, or Armenian Catholic Church.

History and data
The Catholic Church in Ukraine consists of members of the Ukrainian Greek Catholic Church as well as the Latin Church, Ruthenian Greek Catholic Church, and the Armenian Catholic Church.

The majority of Ukrainian Catholics belong to the Ukrainian Greek Catholic Church. The Latin Church in the territories of modern Ukraine has been strongly associated with Poland and Poles, but the church has emphasized a Ukrainian identity since the nation's independence from the Soviet Union.

The history of the Catholic Church in modern Ukraine starts as early as the 10th century when Christianity in Ruthenia was established as a state religion in 988 taking place before the East–West Schism. While records of Christians and Christian temples in the Medieval state predate the date. In mid-10th century, Kyiv was visited by a mission that was led by bishop Adalbert of Magdeburg out of Trier Monastery. Following the schism, the Ruthenian Church which was brought to Kyiv by the Byzantine Greeks ended up among Eastern Orthodox Churches. After annexation of the Kingdom of Ruthenia by the Kingdom of Poland in course of the Galicia–Volhynia Wars in Lviv was established the Roman Catholic Archdiocese of Lviv in the 14th century. In mid-15th century Metropolitan of Kyiv Isidore attempted to unite the Ruthenian Church with the Catholic world by attending the Council of Florence.

Due to the conflict with the Grand Duchy of Moscow, in 1458 the Ecumenical Patriarch of Constantinople Isidore II reorganized the Ruthenian Church moving its metropolitan see to Vilnius. Until 1480, the metropolitan see of the Church was held by a metropolitan bishop appointed by the Pope including Gregory the Bulgarian and Misail Pstruch. In 1595, there was signed the Union of Brest which officially united the Ruthenian Church with the Catholic Church accomplishing the intent of Metropolitan Isidore. Following partitions of Poland, in 1839 in Polotsk pressured by the Russian government most of bishops of the Ruthenian Uniate Church signed the union with the Patriarchate of Moscow, while diocese that became part of the Austrian Empire were reorganized as Greek-Catholic Church.

In 1630, a bishop of Armenian Apostolic Church Mikołaj Torosowicz also signed a union with the Catholic Church establishing Armenian Catholic diocese of Lwow.

In 1646, another Eastern Orthodox diocese of Mukachevo signed the Union of Uzhhorod and for sometime was guided by the Archbishop of Eger in Hungary.

In 2001, Ukraine was visited by Pope John Paul II, who held official and informal meetings in Kyiv and Lviv. Obviously the  Ukrainian Greek Catholic Church and the Latin Church in the country warmly greeted a visit from their spiritual father. Non-Catholic religious communities expressed hope that the visit would encourage a spiritual and cultural renewal in a country troubled by economic and social problems.

Catholic charity Caritas Spes (by 2007 information) functions in 12 regions of the country, has 40 centers engaging 500 employees and volunteers. It runs six family-style homes for orphans with 60 children, financed health rehabilitation camps situated in environmentally healthful areas around Kyiv, Zhytomyr, Ivano-Frankivsk, and Transcarpathian regions, benefits 2,500 children each year. About 12,000 Ukrainian children, mainly victims of Chernobyl, orphans, and children from poor families, had their health improved in this way in 2002–2007.

Ukrainian Greek Catholic Church
The Ukrainian Greek Catholic Church is a Byzantine Rite Eastern Catholic Church in full communion with the Holy See. The ordinary (or hierarch) of the church holds the title of Major Archbishop of Kyiv-Halych and All Ruthenia, though the hierarchs and faithful of the church have acclaimed their ordinary as "Patriarch" and have requested Papal recognition of, and elevation to, this title. Major archbishop is a unique title within the Catholic Church that was introduced in 1963 as part of political compromise. Since March 2011, the head of the church is Major Archbishop Sviatoslav Shevchuk.

Latin Catholic Church in Ukraine
 
The present Archbishop for the Latins is Mieczysław Mokrzycki (ordained on 29 September 2007 by Pope Benedict XVI).

The Latin Church in Ukraine had in 2007; 905 communities, 88 monasteries, 656 monks and nuns, 527 priests, 713 churches (74 under construction), 39 missions, 8 educational institutions, 551 Sunday schools, 14 periodical editions.

Latin Catholic cathedrals in Ukraine
 Sts. Peter and Paul Cathedral, in Kamyanets-Podilsky
 Cathedral of the Assumption of the Blessed Virgin Mary in Kharkiv
 Merciful Father Co-Cathedral, in Zaporizhia
 Saint Sophia Cathedral, in Zhytomyr
 St. Alexander Co-Cathedral, in Kyiv
 Sts. Peter and Paul Cathedral, in Lutsk
 Archcathedral Basilica of the Assumption of the Blessed Virgin Mary, in Lviv
 Cathedral of St. Martin of Tours, in Mukacheve
 Assumption of the Blessed Virgin Mary Cathedral, in Odesa.

Hierarchy
See: List of Catholic dioceses in Ukraine

See also
Roman Catholic Archdiocese of Lviv
Superior Institute of Religious Sciences of St. Thomas Aquinas
Ukrainian Catholic University
Granting of autocephaly to the Orthodox Church of Ukraine

References

External links
The Latin Church in Ukraine
Apostolic Nunciature in Ukraine
OFM in Ukraine

 
Ukraine
Ukraine